Picria is a genus of flowering plants belonging to the family Plantaginaceae.

Its native range is Himalaya to Southern China and Peninsula Malaysia, Philippines.

Species:
 Picria fel-terrae Lour.

References

Plantaginaceae
Plantaginaceae genera